The Atlantic City catboat is an American sailboat that was designed by D. Martin as a cruiser and first built in 1980.

The design can be confused with the unrelated 1913 Atlantic City Catboat Class.

Production
The design was built by Mark-O Custom Boats in the United States, starting in 1980, but it is now out of production.

Design
The Atlantic City is a recreational keelboat, built predominantly of solid laminate fabmat (stitched fiberglass fabric), with wood trim. It is a gaff rigged catboat with wooden spars. The hull has a plumb stem, an angled transom, a shallow-draft, transom-hung rudder controlled by a tiller or optional wheel and a retractable centerboard. It displaces  and carries  of ballast.

The design has sleeping accommodation for six people, consisting of a convertible aft dinette area double berth and two forward cabin settees with pilot berths above them. It has an optional galley on the port side just forward of the companionway ladder. The galley is "L"-shaped and is equipped with a two-burner stove. A navigation station and a fireplace were also factory options. The head is located in the forepeak. The cabin has  of headroom.

For sailing the design is equipped with mainsail hoops in place of more conventional cars.

Operational history
In a 1994 review Richard Sherwood described the design as a classic catboat.

In a 2010 review Steve Henkel wrote, "if you've ever heard the sailor's description of a cozy cruiser, 'drinks six, eats four, sleeps two,' you'll appreciate that this boat is different: she drinks eight (if squeezed into the cockpit at anchor), eats four (at a dinette below, unless you go for trays on laps), and sleeps six (double berth under the  starboard cockpit, upper and lower berths to starboard forward, and a dinette that converts to another double). We can’t imagine who would want to sleep six in what amounts to a large walk-in closet, unless it’s a family with four small kids. Best features: For the large, close-knit family that is totally committed to catboats, this might be a good choice ... Worst features: Her sail area of 452 square feet, all in one big piece of cloth, can be hard to manage. Her centerboard shape, with its cutout forward to avoid cluttering up the cabin with a centerboard trunk, could be a problem too."

See also
List of sailing boat types

Similar sailboats
Achilles 24
Balboa 24
C&C 24
Challenger 24
Columbia 24
Dana 24
Islander 24
Islander 24 Bahama
MacGregor 24
Mirage 24
San Juan 24
Seidelmann 245
Tonic 23

References

1980s sailboat type designs
Sailing yachts
Sailboat types built by Mark-O Custom Boats